Maya is a 1949 French drama film directed by Raymond Bernard and starring Viviane Romance, Marcel Dalio and Jean-Pierre Grenier. It is based on a 1924 play of the same title by Simon Gantillon. It was shot at the Studio François I in Paris. The film's sets were designed by the art director Léon Barsacq.

Cast
 Viviane Romance as Bella dite Maya
 Marcel Dalio as 	Le steward
 Jean-Pierre Grenier as 	Jean 
 Jacques Castelot as 	Ernest
 Georges Douking as 	Un soutier 
 Valéry Inkijinoff as 	Cachemire 
 Georges Vitray as Le commandant 
 Maurice Régamey as	Michel
 Max Dalban as 	Le gros homme
 Françoise Hornez as 	Fifine
 Fréhel as 	Notre Mère 
 Philippe Nicaud as 	Albert
 Jane Morlet as 	La vieille 
 Marthe Sarbel as La logeuse
 Yette Lucas as 	La bouquetière
 Jean Clarieux as 	Le policier
 Daniel Mendaille as 	Le directeur du bureau de navigation
 Louis Seigner as Le paysan
 Dominique Davray as 	Une entraîneuse qui danse 
 Robert Hossein as 	Un témoin du meurtre qui n'a rien vu

References

Bibliography
 Goble, Alan. The Complete Index to Literary Sources in Film. Walter de Gruyter, 1999.
 Roust, Colin. Georges Auric: A Life in Music and Politics. Oxford University Press, 2020.

External links 
 

1949 films
French drama films
1940s French-language films
1949 drama films
Films directed by Raymond Bernard
Lux Film films
French films based on plays
1940s French films